The 1996–97 Hungarian Cup (Hungarian: Samsung Magyar Kupa) had involved professional teams at all levels throughout the country. The winner of the Hungarian Cup is guaranteed no worse than one of Hungary's one spots in the UEFA Cup Winners' Cup. In 1997, MTK Budapest FC won the competition by beating NB I 6th place BVSC Budapest in the final on May 21, 1997.

Group stage

Group 1

{| width=100% cellspacing=1
!width=20%| !!width=12%| !!width=20%|
!
|-
|July 1996

|-
|July 1996

|-
|August 1996

Group 2

{| width=100% cellspacing=1
!width=20%| !!width=12%| !!width=20%|
!
|-
|July 1996

|-
|July 1996

|-
|August 1996

Group 3

{| width=100% cellspacing=1
!width=20%| !!width=12%| !!width=20%|
!
|-
|July 1996

|-
|July 1996

|-
|August 1996

Group 4

{| width=100% cellspacing=1
!width=20%| !!width=12%| !!width=20%|
!
|-
|July 1996

|-
|July 1996

|-
|August 1996

Group 5

{| width=100% cellspacing=1
!width=20%| !!width=12%| !!width=20%|
!
|-
|July 1996

|-
|July 1996

|-
|August 1996

Group 6

{| width=100% cellspacing=1
!width=20%| !!width=12%| !!width=20%|
!
|-
|July 1996

|-
|July 1996

|-
|August 1996

Group 7

{| width=100% cellspacing=1
!width=20%| !!width=12%| !!width=20%|
!
|-
|July 1996

|-
|July 1996

|-
|August 1996

Group 8

{| width=100% cellspacing=1
!width=20%| !!width=12%| !!width=20%|
!
|-
|July 1996

|-
|July 1996

|-
|August 1996

Group 9

{| width=100% cellspacing=1
!width=20%| !!width=12%| !!width=20%|
!
|-
|July 1996

|-
|July 1996

|-
|August 1996

Group 10

{| width=100% cellspacing=1
!width=20%| !!width=12%| !!width=20%|
!
|-
|July 1996

|-
|July 1996

|-
|August 1996

Group 11

{| width=100% cellspacing=1
!width=20%| !!width=12%| !!width=20%|
!
|-
|July 1996

|-
|July 1996

|-
|August 1996

Group 12

{| width=100% cellspacing=1
!width=20%| !!width=12%| !!width=20%|
!
|-
|July 1996

|-
|July 1996

|-
|August 1996

Group 13

{| width=100% cellspacing=1
!width=20%| !!width=12%| !!width=20%|
!
|-
|July 1996

|-
|July 1996

|-
|August 1996

Group 14

{| width=100% cellspacing=1
!width=20%| !!width=12%| !!width=20%|
!
|-
|July 1996

|-
|July 1996

|-
|August 1996

Group 15

{| width=100% cellspacing=1
!width=20%| !!width=12%| !!width=20%|
!
|-
|July 1996

|-
|July 1996

|-
|August 1996

Group 16

{| width=100% cellspacing=1
!width=20%| !!width=12%| !!width=20%|
!
|-
|July 1996

|-
|July 1996

|-
|August 1996

Round of 32

First leg

Second leg

Round of 16

First leg

Second leg

Quarter-finals

Semi-finals

Final

References

External links
 Official site 
 soccerway.com

1996-97
1996–97 domestic association football cups
Magyar Kupa